The Witching Hour is a 1921 American silent drama film directed by William Desmond Taylor and written by Julia Crawford Ivers, adapting the 1907 stage play by Augustus E. Thomas. The film stars Elliott Dexter, Winter Hall, Ruth Renick, Robert Cain, A. Edward Sutherland, Mary Alden, and F. A. Turner. The film was released on April 10, 1921, by Paramount Pictures.

This was one of three times that the 1907 stage play was adapted to film, and according to critic Christopher Workman, was "the least interesting of the three film adaptations". A print of this film currently exists in the Library of Congress.

British-born actor A. Edward Sutherland starred in a number of silent films before moving to the United States where he became a director, working on such Hollywood films as Murders in the Zoo (1932), Beyond Tomorrow (1940) and The Invisible Woman (1940).

Plot
Clay Whipple (Sutherland) is convicted of murdering the governor following an incident involving a cat's eye pin. Whipple is sentenced to death, but a mentalist named Psychic Jack (Dexter) believes he is innocent since Whipple had been hypnotized at the time of the murder. The psychic persuades the judge to grant the condemned man a retrial, and he sets out to uncover the identity of the real killer, during which time he manages to prevent a second murder from occurring.

Cast 
Elliott Dexter as Psychic Jack Brookfield
Winter Hall as Judge Prentice
Ruth Renick as Viola Campbell 
Robert Cain as Frank Hardmuth
A. Edward Sutherland as Clay Whipple 
Mary Alden as Helen Whipple
F. A. Turner as Lew Ellinger
Genevieve Blinn as Mrs. Campbell
Charles West as Tom Denning
L. M. Wells as Judge Henderson
Clarence Geldart as Colonel Bailey 
Jim Blackwell as Harvey

Preservation status
The film still exists and is preserved at the Gosfilmofond Russian state and the Library of Congress.

References

External links 

 

1921 films
1920s English-language films
Silent American drama films
1921 drama films
Paramount Pictures films
Films directed by William Desmond Taylor
American black-and-white films
American silent feature films
1920s American films